David Terence Richards (2 November 1932 – 14 June 2014) was a British actor and stuntman, best known for his appearance as the Arabian swordsman in the 1981 Indiana Jones film Raiders of the Lost Ark. During his career, Richards worked on over 100 productions across film and television; worked in nine James Bond films; fought as a stuntman in scenes with Indiana Jones, James Bond, Luke Skywalker and Rambo; and doubled for Donald Sutherland, Tom Selleck and Christopher Lee.

Biography

Born in South London to Welsh parents, he served in the Welsh Guards. After finishing his national service, in 1957 whilst working as a scaffolder, a friend from the Guards told him they needed extras with military training. After gaining the job, he was asked if he could fall off scaffolding during a riot scene, which he accepted. In 1958 he served as a fighting extra alongside Kirk Douglas in The Vikings, and in 1960 was a co-founder of The Stunt Register, a UK industry list of accredited stunt performers. He also appeared in an episode of The Avengers as a Cybernaut, a murderous silver robot controlled by Peter Cushing.

Richards' most famous scene was as the scripted "large Arabian swordsman" in the 1981 Indiana Jones film Raiders of the Lost Ark. Director Steven Spielberg shot the production's Cairo, Egypt-located fight scenes in the town of Kairouan, Tunisia. Richards had practiced for weeks with his heavy Arabian sword to create the scripted fight scene, choreographing a fight between the swordsman and Jones's whip. However, after filming the initial shots of the scene (and with Harrison Ford suffering from dysentery), after lunch, Ford and Spielberg agreed to cut the scene down to a single gunshot, giving Jones a humorously unfair advantage. It was later voted in at No.5 on Playboy magazine's list of best all-time scenes, and also created a Lego character of the large Arab.

Richards retired after his last performance in the 1997 James Bond film Tomorrow Never Dies, where his character beat-up Pierce Brosnan in a recording studio in Germany. Richards lived his later life  in Ruislip. 
His funeral service and burial took place on 24 June 2014 at Breakspear Crematorium following his death from a sudden cardiac arrest in his sleep.

Filmography

References

External links

Welsh Guards soldiers
Male actors from London
English stunt performers
1932 births
2014 deaths
British stunt performers
British actors